Ajay Rao (also credited as Krishna Ajay Rao) is an Indian actor who works primarily in Kannada film industry. He rose to fame with 2003 blockbuster movie Excuse Me.

Career
Ajay Rao debuted as a lead with the film Excuse Me (2003) and later appeared in films like Taj Mahal (2008), Krishnan Love Story (2010), Krishnan Marriage Story (2011), and Krishna Leela (2015). With Krishna Leela (2015) he debuted as a producer launching his home banner Shree Krishna Arts And Creations.

Personal life
He married his long-time girlfriend Sapna on 18 December 2014. Four years later they have a daughter named cherishma

Filmography

References

External links
 
 Ajay Rao on Filmibeat.com
Love You Racchu 

Living people
Indian male film actors
Male actors in Kannada cinema
21st-century Indian male actors
Kannada film producers
1980 births